Grouvellina descarpentriesi is a species of ground beetle in the subfamily Rhysodinae. It was described by R.T. & J.R. Bell in 1979.

References

Grouvellina
Beetles described in 1979